The 20th Annual 24 Hour Pepsi Challenge was a 24-hour endurance sports car race held on January 30-January 31, 1982 at the Daytona International Speedway road course. The race served as the opening round of the 1982 IMSA GT Championship.

Victory overall and in the GTP class went to the No. 18 JLP Racing Porsche 935 driven by John Paul, John Paul Jr., and Rolf Stommelen. Victory in the GTO Class went to the No. 77 Mazda of North America Mazda RX-7 driven by Yoshimi Katayama, Takashi Yorino, and Yojiro Terada. Victory in the GTU class went to the No. 98 Kent Racing Mazda RX-7 driven by Kathy Rude, Lee Mueller, and Allan Moffat.

Race results
Class winners in bold.

References

24 Hours of Daytona
1982 in sports in Florida
1982 in American motorsport